Kashkanteniz is a lake in the Moiynkum District, Jambyl Region, Kazakhstan.

Geography
Its shores are flat and marshy and the water of the lake is salty. In the past it had been connected with Lake Balkhash.

Kashkanteniz freezes in mid November and thaws in March. On average its surface increases right after the melting of the snows in the spring. The lake may dry up completely in the summer. Sometimes strong winds blowing from the northeast spray Balkhash surface water that reaches the marshes at the southern end of the lake.

See also
List of lakes of Kazakhstan

References

External links
Sary Shagan amethyst occurrence ("Priozersk"; Kashkanteniz), Moiynkum, Jambyl Region, Kazakhstan

Lakes of Kazakhstan
Jambyl Region
Balkhash-Alakol Basin